Vusumzi L. Make (1931 – 15 April 2006) was a South African civil rights activist and lawyer. He and the American poet Maya Angelou met in 1961, lived together in Cairo, Egypt, before parting ways in 1962. He was a professor at the University of Liberia in Monrovia, Liberia, from 1968 to 1974.

Time in the Pan Africanist Congress
When Potlako Leballo, Chairman of the Pan Africanist Congress (PAC), was forced out of the position, Make joined a Presidential Council consisting of David Sibeko, Ellias Ntloedibe, and himself. Several months later, Make became the sole chairman. He resigned from the chairmanship in January 1981 to make way for John Nyathi Pokela, who had been recently imprisoned on Robben Island. Under Pokela, Make served as deputy chairman of the PAC.

Death
Make died on 15 April 2006 in the HF Verwoerd hospital in Pretoria at the age of 75. He was survived by his widow Alma Liziwe Make and daughter Titise.

References

External links
Statement on behalf of the South Africa United Front, an anti-apartheid piece written by Make and Oliver Tambo

South African revolutionaries
Anti-apartheid activists
1931 births
2006 deaths
Academic staff of the University of Liberia
Pan Africanist Congress of Azania politicians